Jagdish Lal Ahuja, popularly known as Langar Baba (1930s – 29 November 2021), was a social worker from Chandigarh, India. He was known for offering free meals for hungry and poor people. In 2020, he was awarded the Padma Shri, fourth highest civilian award of India, for his contributions in social work.

Early life
Ahuja migrated to the Dominion of India from Peshawar, Dominion of Pakistan, at the age of 12 following the Partition of India. His family took refuge in Patiala and then in Amritsar and Mansa.

Social work
Ahuja served the poor and hungry people by organising Langar daily for 2,500 people. He started organising langar at the Postgraduate Institute of Medical Education and Research, Chandigarh in January 2000 when he was admitted there for treatment of cancer. He later offered free meals at the Government Medical College and Hospital, sector 32, Chandigarh as well.

He offered free meals to people for the last 19 years prior to his death. He sold a chunk of his 36 acres farm, a 9-acre farm, a plot of one kanal in Panchkula and a couple of showrooms to fund the free meals.

Recognition
Ahuja was conferred the Padma Shri, fourth highest civilian award of India, in the field of social work on 26 January 2020.

References

1930s births
2021 deaths
Punjabi people
Recipients of the Padma Shri in social work
Social workers from Chandigarh
People from Chandigarh
Year of birth missing
People from Peshawar